Chinese expedition to Tibet can refer to:

Mongol conquest of Tibet
Battle of the Salween River
Chinese expedition to Tibet (1720)
Qianlong's Expedition to Lhasa
Sino-Nepalese War
Chinese expedition to Tibet (1910)
Battle of Chamdo

See also
Sino-Tibetan War (disambiguation)